T. S. Kalyanaraman (born 1 January 1951) is an Indian businessman, best known as the chairman and managing director of Kalyan Jewellers and Kalyan Developers. Kalyan Group is the holding company of Kalyan Jewellers.

Early life
T. S. Kalyanaraman Iyer was born in Thiruvananthapuram, into a Tamil Brahmin family, as the eldest son of T. R. Seetharamaiyer. He was named after his paternal grandfather, who was also the founder of Kalyan Group. He learned the business from his father when he was 12, by helping his father in his shop. Later he joined Sree Kerala Varma College and studied commerce.

Career
Later, he expanded the business to 32 showrooms all over South India.

Personal life
He has two sons and a daughter.

References

Living people
Indian billionaires
Businesspeople from Thrissur
1951 births
Sree Kerala Varma College alumni